Gormlaith ingen Murchada (960–1030), sometimes spelled Gormflaith, was an Irish queen.

Life
Gormlaith was born in Naas, County Kildare, Ireland. Her father was Murchad mac Finn, King of Leinster, and her brother was Máel Mórda mac Murchada. According to annalistic accounts, she was married to Olaf Cuaran, the Viking king of Dublin and York until his death in 981; and mother to his son, King Sigtrygg Silkbeard. 

After Sigtrygg's defeat at the Battle of Glenn Máma in 999, Gormlaith was married to Brian Boru, the King of Munster and High King of Ireland, and mother to his son and later King of Munster, Donnchad. It is also alleged that she married Máel Sechnaill mac Domnaill after Olaf's death, but this is somewhat contentious as the sources for this marriage are less reliable. The Irish annals record Gormlaith's death in 1030.

Gormlaith is most infamous for allegedly inciting men to such a degree that she caused the Battle of Clontarf in 1014. Given that her goading episode exists only in literary sources not contemporary with her lifetime, and, indeed, written long after her death, it is highly unlikely that such an event ever occurred. Very little is known about the actual historical figure since the majority of depictions of Gormlaith were composed well after her life.

Annalistic and genealogical accounts 

The first annalistic account regarding Gormlaith appears in the Annals of Inisfallen, a major extant record of Munster history. The entry of her death was composed some 62 years after her death, making it the most contemporary and temporally proximate. This account stated, 
  
Gormlaith's father was Murchad, son of Finn and this statement paired with Queen of Munster, leaves little doubt amongst scholars that this reference is to Gormlaith. The Annals of Tigernach are the next chronologically contemporaneous account with a reference to Gormlaith. These annals, compiled in the Irish midlands, stated,

Gormlaith also appears in genealogical accounts written more than 100 years after her death. The first of these accounts is found in the Banshenchas, a catalogue of famous medieval Irish women. The entry in this account echoed the annalistic accounts and names Olaf Cuaran and Brian Boru as her husbands and Sigtrygg and Donnchad as her sons. Gormlaith also appears in the twelfth-century genealogies found in the Book of Leinster dating from 1150 to 1201. From this entry derives the famous "three leaps" of Gormlaith poem, which states she made a "leap in Dublin, a leap in Tara and a leap in Cashel". Some scholars have used these "three leaps" as evidence of her three marriages to Olaf Cuaran, Brian Boru and Máel Sechnaill, contradicting the annalistic accounts which refer to only two marriages. In particular, the validity of this third marriage to Máel Sechnaill and her alleged divorce from Brian Boru, have been of serious contention amongst scholars. The "three leaps" poem contained in 12th-century genealogies is the only medieval Irish account to potentially suggest a third marriage. However, some scholars have argued that the reference here to "three leaps" is referring instead to children and not, in fact, to marriages.

Mediaeval literary accounts 
Gormlaith has been depicted in many contexts since her death, and she is arguably best known for her portrayal in the Cogadh Gaedhil re Gallaibh. This literary work of propaganda was composed between 1103 and 1111 by a descendant of Brian Boru, Muirchertach Ua Briain. This text detailed the ascent to power of his illustrious ancestor in an effort to highlight the prestige of his dynasty. Gormlaith makes her appearance in a singular scene in which she has garnered much notoriety in subsequent sources, is her inciting scene. To provide context: prior to this her brother, Mael Mordha, has ceded vassalage to Brian Boru. 

In this depiction, Gormlaith, unsuccessfully, attempted to goad her brother into going to war against her husband Brian Boru.

Njál's Saga, a thirteenth-century Icelandic literary work, referred to her as Kormloð, and portrayed her as a jealous divorcee bent on revenge on her ex-husband Brian Boru.

In this narrative, she goads her son Sigtrygg, unlike the Cogadh, where she attempted to incite her brother, Mael Mordha. She prompted Sigtrygg into gathering support from Vikings outside Ireland, most notably Earl Sigurd of Orkney and Brodir of the Isle of Man, by promising her hand in marriage. This is the first work to introduce the idea that Gormlaith was divorced from Brian Boru.

Early Modern narrative texts 
A separate strain of wholly negative conceptions of Gormlaith appeared in Geoffrey Keating's Foras Feasa Ar Eirinn composed in 1634. In this text Keating makes explicit the link between Gormlaith's goading and Máel Mórda's declaration of war. Gormlaith's remarks in this Early Modern account weighed on Máel Mórda, contributing to his quarrel with Murchad and eventually lead the "Leinster king to seek allies in the war against the Dál Cais". As to why Keating decided to place the cause of hostilities with Gormlaith is up for some debate. One scholar, Meidhbhín Ní Úrdail suggested that he was influenced by Meredith Hamner's Chronicle of Ireland published in 1633, where the cause of Clontarf is attributed not to Gormlaith, but an anonymous "merchant's wife". Keating's work would in turn influence a slightly later text of the same period, Cath Cluana Tarbh. Only one version of this work contains a reference to Gormlaith, but the depiction is derived from Keating.

See also
 Mongfind

References

Further reading
Ancestral Roots of Certain American Colonists Who Came to America Before 1700 by Frederick Lewis Weis; Lines 175–1, 239-2

External links
The Story of Gormlaith: Jealous Divorcee or Literary Victim?
 A History of Vikings in Scotland
 Events leading up to the Battle of Clontarf
 Njal's Saga
 Gormflaith's marriages and families online
 Gormflaith was a Naas woman 
 Who was Gormlaith's mother? A detective story, by Muireann Ní Bhrolcháin. In: Lost and Found II – Rediscovering Ireland's past. (Ireland, 2009), pp. 83–94.
 'Tales of three Gormlaiths in early Irish literature by Máire Ní Mhaonaigh. In Ériu 52 (2002), pp. 1–24.
 Viking Age Queens and Identity by Shannon Lewis-Simpson. In The Viking Age: Ireland and the West, Proceedings of the Fifteenth Viking Congress (Cork, 2005), John Sheehan & Donnchadh Ó Corráin (eds), pp. 217–226.
Gormflaith, the Queen by L. M. McCraith. In: Romance of Irish Heroines (Dublin) pp. 42–50.
'Gormflaith and the Northmen of Dublin by G. C. Stacpoole. In: Dublin Historical Record, Vol. XX, No. 1, December (1964) pp. 4–18.
'Gormlaith ingen Murchada ben Briain by Catherine Swift. From: Brian Boru Lecture Series, Mary Immaculate College.
Contextualizing Gormlaith: Portrayals and Perceptions of a Medieval Irish Queen by Christina Wade. Unpublished M.Phil. Dissertation, 2012.
Queen Gormlaith, Brian Boru and the Northmen of Dublin by Howard B Clarke, Dublin City Lunchtime Lecture Series, 8 April 2014.
"Gormflaith - A Naas Woman?" by James Durney, Co. Kildare Online Electronic Journal, 16 February 2008.
"A Game of Thrones: Leinster v Munster at the Battle of Clontarf" by James Durney, Co. Kildare Online Electronic Journal, 27 March 2014,

Irish royal consorts
960 births
1030 deaths
10th-century Irish people
11th-century Irish people
11th-century Irish women
Irish princesses
10th-century Irish women
Remarried royal consorts
Viking Age women
People from County Kildare
Gaels